Consort Xiao may refer to:

Empress Xiao (Sui dynasty) (566–648), wife of Emperor Yang of Sui
Pure Consort Xiao (died 655), concubine of Emperor Gaozong of Tang
Empress Zhenxian (died 847), concubine of Emperor Muzong of Tang
Xiao Wen (died 936), wife of Emperor Taizong of Liao
Empress Rouzhen (died 951), concubine of prince Yelü Bei
Xiao Sagezhi (died 951), consort of Emperor Shizong of Liao
Xiao sisters
Xiao Hunian (died 1007), wife of the prince Yelü Yanchege
Princess Xiao (died after 981), wife of the prince Yelü Xiyin
Xiao Yanyan (953–1009), wife of Emperor Jingzong of Liao
Xiao Noujin (980–1057), concubine of Emperor Shengzong of Liao
Xiao Guanyin (1040–1075), wife of Emperor Daozong of Liao
Xiao Tabuyan (died after 1150), Yelü Dashi's wife

See also
Yu Daolian (died 366), Jin dynasty empress, posthumously known as Empress Xiao
Xiao Wenshou (343–423), mother of Liu Song's founding emperor Liu Yu